William Drayton (born 1943) is an American social entrepreneur. Drayton was named by U.S. News & World Report as one of America's 25 Best Leaders in 2005.  He is responsible for the rise of the phrase "social entrepreneur", a concept first found in print in 1972.

Drayton is the founder and current chair of Ashoka: Innovators for the Public, a 501(c)(3) organization dedicated to finding and fostering social entrepreneurs worldwide. Drayton also chairs two other 501(c)(3) organizations, namely Youth Venture and Get America Working!

According to Drayton's philosophy, social entrepreneurs are individuals with innovative solutions to society's most pressing social problems. To quote Drayton, "Social entrepreneurs are not content just to give a fish or teach how to fish. They will not rest until they have revolutionized the fishing industry."

He was elected a Member of the American Philosophical Society in 2019.

Early years 
Drayton's mother emigrated to the United States from Australia. His father was an American who became an explorer. His ancestors were some of the earliest anti-slavery abolitionist and women's leaders in the U.S. Drayton was born in 1943 in New York City.

Drayton attended high school at Phillips Academy, where he established the Asia Society, which soon became the school's most popular student organization. He attended Harvard where he received his Bachelor of Arts degree in 1965, where he created the Ashoka Table, bringing in prominent government, union, and church leaders for off-the-record dinners at which students could ask "how things really worked". Drayton entered Balliol College, Oxford and received a Master of Arts degree in 1967. He attended Yale Law School where he received his Juris Doctor in 1970. At Yale Law School, Drayton founded Yale Legislative Services, which, at its peak, involved a third of the law school's student body.

Career 

Drayton became a manager and management consultant, working for McKinsey & Company as a consultant for almost ten years.

During the administration of President Jimmy Carter (1977–1981), Drayton was an Assistant Administrator of the Environmental Protection Agency where he launched emissions trading, among other reforms.

Drayton has served as a visiting professor at Harvard University and Stanford University.

Awards 
Drayton has received many awards and acknowledgments for his achievements. He was elected one of the early MacArthur Fellows for his work, including the founding of Ashoka: Innovators for the Public.

The American Society of Public Administration and the National Academy of Public Administration jointly awarded him their National Public Service Award and he has also been named a Preiskel–Silverman Fellow for Yale Law School and is a member of the American Academy of Arts and Sciences.

On May 25, 2009, Drayton was awarded an honorary degree, Doctorate of Humane Letters, by Yale University at commencement.

David Gergen has called Drayton the "godfather of social entrepreneurship." And in 2008, Drayton was named a "visionary" as one of Utne Reader magazine's "50 Visionaries Who Are Changing the World".

In 2011, Drayton won Spain's prestigious Prince of Asturias Awards for international cooperation for his work promoting entrepreneurs. The prize foundation described him as a "driving force behind the figure of social entrepreneurs, men and women who undertake innovative initiatives for the common good".

Within the next two weeks, Drayton also accepted the John W. Gardner Leadership award, "established in 1985 to honor outstanding Americans who exemplify the leadership and the ideals of John W. Gardner", and the World Entrepreneurship Forum's Social Entrepreneur Award.

In 2012, Drayton was named an inaugural recipient of Middlebury College's Center for Social Entrepreneurship Vision Award, in recognition of the impact of his contributions to the field of social entrepreneurship.

References

External links 

 Ashoka Leadership page (Drayton profile and others)
 Video (and audio) of interview with Bill Drayton at Bloggingheads.tv
 MIT Press Journals - Innovations: "Everyone a Changemaker" by William Drayton
 Lessons for Social Entrepreneurs from Bill Drayton & Ashoka Foundation

1943 births
American environmentalists
Ashoka USA Fellows
Harvard University alumni
Living people
MacArthur Fellows
McKinsey & Company people
Phillips Academy alumni
Social entrepreneurs
Yale Law School alumni
Alumni of Balliol College, Oxford
Members of the American Philosophical Society